Averardo de' Medici (1320 – 1363), also known as Everard De Medici or Bicci to disambiguate with his two homonymous ancestors, was the son of Salvestro de' Medici (1300, Florence – 1346, Florence; son of Averardo II de' Medici, 1270–1319), "il Chiarissimo" (English meaning "the fairest" for his complexion, or also interpreted as "the clearest") and the father of three children: Giovanni, Francesco, and Antonia.  Giovanni di Bicci de' Medici would become the first historically significant member of the Medici family of Florence and the founder of the Medici Bank.

He was named after the legendary knight Averardo, from whom the Medici claimed descent. He was a second cousin of Salvestro de' Medici.

Children
 Giovanni di Bicci de' Medici; married Piccarda Bueri.
 Francesco de' Medici (d. 1402); married Selvaggia Gianfigliazzi and Francesca Balducci.
 Antonia de' Medici; married Angelo Ardinghelli.

References

External links
PBS - Medici: Godfathers of the Renaissance
THE MEDICI Genealogical tree from Florence Art Guide - The Renaissance
Medici Family from The Galileo Project
Image of Medici family tree

Averardo
Nobility from Florence
14th-century Italian nobility
1320 births
1363 deaths
14th-century people of the Republic of Florence